The Jerichaus were a family of Danish artists:

Jens Adolf Jerichau (1816–1883), a sculptor
Elisabeth Jerichau-Baumann (1819–1881), his wife, a painter, originally from Poland
Their sons:
Thorald Jerichau (1848-1909), an organist and composer
Harald Jerichau (1851–1878), a landscape painter
Holger H. Jerichau (1861-1900), a landscape painter
 (1890-1916), Holger's son, an expressionist painter

Danish families
Artist families